Cliff Ollier (born 26 October 1931) is a geologist, geomorphologist, soil scientist, emeritus professor and honorary research fellow, at the School of Earth and Geographical Sciences University of Western Australia. He was formerly at Australian National University, University of New England, Australia, Canberra University, University of Papua New Guinea, and University of Melbourne.

In the late 1950s he worked on a soil survey in the Northern and Eastern provinces of Uganda. 

Throughout his career he was a prolific author (as C.D Ollier), and he has contributed to reference works such as The Oxford Companion to the Earth.

Publications
Why the Greenland and Antarctic Ice Sheets are Not Collapsing
Lysenko and Global Warming, Energy & Environment, 20 (2009), 197–200.
Volcanoes; (1st ed 1969); (2nd ed 1988)
The Origin of Mountains with Colin Pain (2000)  
Ancient landforms

References

Australian geologists
Academic staff of the University of Western Australia
Living people
Australian geomorphologists
1931 births
Academic staff of the University of Papua New Guinea
Academic staff of the Australian National University
Academic staff of the University of New England (Australia)